Milán Szabó (born 28 December 1990 in Vác) is a Hungarian cross-country skier and biathlete. He debuted in 2013 and competed for Hungary at the 2014 Winter Olympics in cross-country skiing.

External links

References 

Hungarian male biathletes
Olympic cross-country skiers of Hungary
People from Vác
1990 births
Living people
Cross-country skiers at the 2014 Winter Olympics
Competitors at the 2015 Winter Universiade
Sportspeople from Pest County
21st-century Hungarian people